The Saphir was an express train operated by the Deutsche Bundesbahn linking the port of Ostend with Dortmund as part of a link between London and the Ruhr. The name Saphir, German for sapphire, refers to the Belgian gemstone industry.

History

Beginnings
The initial service started in 1954 as post-war successor of the Ostend–Cologne Pullman Express. Its schedule was coordinated with an Ostend–Dover ferry run and a Dover–London train, and overall the schedule that came into effect with the Saphirs introduction "permitt[ed] passengers leaving London (Victoria) at 10:00 to reach destinations in the Rhine–Ruhr district of Germany some three hours earlier than formerly".

The service used a class  diesel multiple unit.  In its early years, the Saphir was referred to as the "Sapphire" in English publications, but by 1963 even the English Cook's Continental Timetable was calling it by its German name, Saphir.

Trans Europ Express
The Saphir was upgraded to a first-class-only Trans Europ Express (TEE) on 2 June 1957. The VT 08 were replaced by DB Class VT 11.5 trainsets as soon as these were available, on 15 July 1957.  The timetable was designed to provide a TEE link from Brussels to Frankfurt am Main as well as a connection with the TEE Rhein–Main in Cologne. After one year of service the Saphirs route itself was altered with Frankfurt instead of Dortmund being the German terminus.  In 1966, the route was cut back from Ostend to Brussels, making the TEE Saphirs route Brussels–Frankfurt.

Post-TEE
On 27 May 1979, the Saphir was downgraded to a two-class InterCity train, without any change to its route.  In June 1980, the eastern terminus was moved back to the Ruhr district, but to Cologne rather than Dortmund.  In 1981, the route was re-extended from Brussels to Ostend, making the Saphirs route now Ostend – Brussels – Cologne.

On 31 May 1987, with the launch of the new EuroCity network, the Saphir was replaced by the EC Memling.

See also

 History of rail transport in Belgium
 History of rail transport in Germany
 List of named passenger trains of Europe

References

Works cited

International named passenger trains
Named passenger trains of Belgium
Named passenger trains of Germany
Trans Europ Express
Railway services introduced in 1954
Railway services discontinued in 1987